The Orango National Park is a protected area in Guinea-Bissau. It was established in December 2000. It covers the southern part of the Bissagos Archipelago, notably the islands Orango, Orangozinho, Meneque, Canogo and Imbone, and the surrounding sea. The marine area does not exceed  depth. The park is administered by: Instituto da Biodiversidade e das Áreas Protegidas da Guiné-Bissau (Biodiversity Institute and Protected Areas of Guinea-Bissau). About  of the park is covered by mangroves. It plays a crucial role for the reproduction of molluscs, fish and sea turtles.

On the mainland, palm trees (Elaeis guineensis) are most noticeable, as well as savanna shrubs and sandy shores. It is also the main habitat of the African gray parrot (Psittacus erithacus) which is an otherwise endangered species in the subregion.

References

Bolama Region
Protected areas established in 2000
National parks of Guinea-Bissau
2000 establishments in Guinea-Bissau